Leninsky is a rural locality (a village) in Austrumsky Selsoviet, Iglinsky District, Bashkortostan, Russia. The population was 3 as of 2010. There are 2 streets.

Geography 
Leninsky is located 43 km southeast of Iglino (the district's administrative centre) by road. Voznesenka is the nearest rural locality.

References 

Rural localities in Iglinsky District